Cephalometric analysis is the clinical application of cephalometry. It is analysis of the dental and skeletal relationships of a human skull. It is frequently used by dentists, orthodontists, and oral and maxillofacial surgeons as a treatment planning tool. Two of the more popular methods of analysis used in orthodontology are the Steiner analysis (named after Cecil C. Steiner) and the Downs analysis (named after William B. Downs). There are other methods as well which are listed below.

Cephalometric radiographs
Cephalometric analysis depends on cephalometric radiography to study relationships between bony and soft tissue landmarks and can be used to diagnose facial growth abnormalities prior to treatment, in the middle of treatment to evaluate progress, or at the conclusion of treatment to ascertain that the goals of treatment have been met. A Cephalometric radiograph is a radiograph of the head taken in a Cephalometer (Cephalostat) that is a head-holding device introduced in 1931 by Holly Broadbent Sr. in USA. The Cephalometer is used to obtain standardized and comparable craniofacial images on radiographic films.

machine and dimensions
To carry out cephalometry, the X-ray source is placed a steady five feet away from the mid sagittal plane, with film situated just 15 cm from there. This allows for accurate measurements to be taken and recorded. Distance has a direct impact on cephalometric image magnification. With an object-to-film interval of 15 cm and a source-to-object span of 5 feet, magnification of anatomical landmarks will be reduced in all three dimensions.When attempting to analyze a patient's anatomy through lateral and frontal cephalograms, the challenge arises due to these images being two-dimensional projections of three-dimensional structures. Magnification and distortion as an outcome of traditional radiography further complicates the process by blurring important details.

Lateral cephalometric radiographs

Lateral cephalometric radiograph is a radiograph of the head taken with the x-ray beam perpendicular to the patient's sagittal plane. Natural head position is a standardized orientation of the head that is reproducible for each individual and is used as a means of standardization during analysis of dentofacial morphology both for photos and radiographs. The concept of natural head position was introduced by Coenraad Moorrees and M. R Kean in 1958 and now is a common method of head orientation for cephalometric radiography.

Registration of the head in its natural position while obtaining a cephalogram has the advantage that an extracranial line (the true vertical or a line perpendicular to that) can be used as a reference line for cephalometric analysis, thus bypassing the difficulties imposed by the biologic variation of intracranial reference lines.  True vertical is an external reference line, commonly provided by the image of a free-hanging metal chain on the cephalostat registering on the film or digital cassette during exposure. The true vertical line offers the advantage of no variation (since it is generated by gravity) and is used with radiographs obtained in natural head position.

Posteroanterior (P-A) cephalometric radiograph
A radiograph of the head taken with the x-ray beam perpendicular to the patient's coronal plane with the x-ray source behind the head and the film cassette in front of the patient's face. PA ceph can be evaluated by following analyses that have been developed through the years: 
 Grummon analysis
 MSR
 Hewitt analysis
 Svanholt-Solow analysis
 Grayson analysis

Cephalometric tracing
A cephalometric tracing is an overlay drawing produced from a cephalometric radiograph by digital means and a computer program or by copying specific outlines from it with a lead pencil onto acetate paper, using an illuminated view-box. Tracings are used to facilitate cephalometric analysis, as well as in superimpositions, to evaluate treatment and growth changes. Historically, tracings of the cephalometric radiographs are done on an 0.003 inch thick matte acetate paper by using a #3 pencil. The process is started by marking three registration crosses on the radiograph which are then transferred to the acetate paper.

Anatomical structures are traced first and some structures are bilateral and have tendency to show up as two separate lines, should have an "average" line drawn which is represented as a broken line. These landmarks could include inferior border of mandible.

Cephalometric landmarks
The following are important cephalometric landmarks, which are points of reference serving as datum references in measurement and analysis. (Sources: Proffit; others.)

Landmark points can be joined by lines to form axes, vectors, angles, and planes (a line between 2 points can define a plane by projection). For example, the sella (S) and the nasion (N) are points that together form the sella-nasion line (SN or S-N), which can be projected into the SN plane. A prime symbol (′) usually indicates the point on the skin's surface that corresponds to a given bony landmark (for example, nasion (N) versus skin nasion (N′).

Below is a list of cephalometric planes that are commonly used in different cephalometric analyses.

Classification of analyses 
The basic elements of analysis are angles and distances. Measurements (in degrees or millimetres) may be treated as absolute or relative, or they may be related to each other to express proportional correlations. The various analyses may be grouped into the following:

 Angular – dealing with angles
 Linear – dealing with distances and lengths
 Coordinate – involving the Cartesian (X, Y) or even 3-D planes
 Arcial – involving the construction of arcs to perform relational analyses
These in turn may be grouped according to the following concepts on which normal values have been based:
 Mononormative analyses: averages serve as the norms for these and may be arithmetical (average figures) or geometrical (average tracings), e.g. Bolton Standards
 Multinormative:  for these a whole series of norms are used, with age and sex taken into account, e.g. Bolton Standards
 Correlative: used to assess individual variations of facial structure to establish their mutual relationships, e.g. the Sassouni arcial analysis

Cephalometric angles
According to the Steiner analysis:

ANB (A point, nasion, B point) indicates whether the skeletal relationship between the maxilla and mandible is a normal skeletal class I (+2 degrees), a skeletal Class II (+4 degrees or more), or skeletal class III (0 or negative) relationship.
SNA (sella, nasion, A point) indicates whether or not the maxilla is normal, prognathic, or retrognathic.
SNB (sella, nasion, B point) indicates whether or not the mandible is normal, prognathic, or retrognathic.

SNA and SNB is important to determine what type of intervention (on maxilla, mandible or both) is appropriate. These angles, however are influenced also by the vertical height of the face and a possible abnormal positioning of nasion. By using a comparative set of angles and distances, measurements can be related to one another and to normative values to determine variations in a patient's facial structure.

Analyses (analytic approaches) by various authors

Steiner analysis 
Cecil C. Steiner developed Steiner Analysis in 1953. He used S–N plane as his reference line in comparison to FH plane due to difficulty in identifying the orbitale and porion. Some of the drawbacks of the Steiner analysis includes its reliability on the point nasion. Nasion as a point is known not to be stable due to its growth early in life. Therefore, a posteriorly positioned nasion will increase ANB and more anterior positioned nasion can decrease ANB. In addition, short S–N plane or steeper S–N plane can also lead to greater numbers of SNA, SNB and ANB which may not reflect the true position of the jaws compare to the cranial base. In addition, clockwise rotation of both jaws can increase ANB and counter-clockwise rotation of jaws can decrease ANB.

Wits analysis 
The name Wits is short for Witwatersrand, which is a University in South Africa. Jacobsen in 1975 published an article called "The Wits appraisal of jaw disharmony". This analysis was created as a diagnostic aid to measure the disharmony between the AP degree. The ANB angle can be affected by multitude of environmental factors such as: 
 Patient's age where ANB has tendency to reduce with age
 Change in position of nasion as pubertal growth takes place
 Rotational effect of jaws
 Degree of facial Prognathism  
Therefore, it measured the AP positions of the jaw to each other. This analysis calls for 1. Drawing an Occlusal Plane through the overlapping cusps of Molars and Premolars. 2. Draw perpendicular lines connecting A point and B Point to the Occlusal Plane 3. Label the points as AO and BO.

In his study, Jacobsen mentioned that average jaw relationship is -1mm in Males (AO is behind BO by 1mm) and 0mm in Females (AO and BO coincide). Its clinical significance is that in a Class 2 skeletal patient, AO is located ahead of BO. In skeletal Class 3 patient, BO is located ahead of AO. Therefore, the greater the wits reading, the greater the jaw discrepancy.

Drawbacks to Wits analysis includes:
 Left and Right molar outlines may not always coincide
 Occlusal plane may differ in mixed vs permanent dentition
 If curve of spee is deep then it may be difficult to create a straight occlusal plane
 Angulation of functional occlusal plane to pterygomaxillary vertical plane was shown to decrease from age 4 to 24.

Delaire Analysis 
Prof. Jean Delaire started developing his analysis along with Dr M. Salagnac back in the 70's.  This analysis is still developed and improved by his pupils. This analysis is based on reciprocal proportion and balance and doesn't use standard deviation. It gives the ideal architecture the patient should have, based on his skull shape, posture and functions.

Downs analysis

Bjork analysis 
This analysis by Arne Bjork was developed in 1947 based on 322 Swedish boys and 281 conscripts. He introduced a facial polygon which was based on 5 angles and is listed below. Bjork also developed the 7 structural signs which indicates the mandibular rotator type.  
 Nasion Angle - Formed by line connecting ANS to Nasion to Sella 
 Saddle or Cranial Base Angle - Formed by line connecting Nasion to Sella to Articulare 
 Articular Angle - Formed by line connecting Sella to Articulare to Gonion
 Gonial Angle – Formed by line connecting Articulare to Gonion to Gnathion
 Chin Angle – Formed by line connecting Infradentale to Pogonion to the Mandibular Plane.

Tweed analysis (triangle) 
Charles H. Tweed developed his analysis in the year 1966. In this analysis, he tried describing the lower incisor position in relation to the basal bone and the face. This is described by 3 planes. He used Frankfurt Horizontal plane as a reference line.

Jarabak analysis 
Analysis developed by Joseph Jarabak in 1972. The analysis interprets how the craniofacial growth may affect the pre and post treatment dentition. The analysis is based on 5 points: Nasion (Na), Sella (S), Menton (Me), Go (Gonion) and Articulare (Ar). They together make a Polygon on a face when connected with lines. These points are used to study the anterior/posterior facial height relationships and predict the growth pattern in the lower half of the face. Three important angles used in his analysis are: 1. Saddle Angle - Na, S, Ar 2. Articular Angle - S-Ar-Go, 3. Gonial Angle - Ar-Go-Me.

In a patient who has a clockwise growth pattern, the sum of 3 angles will be higher than 396 degrees. The ratio of posterior height (S-Go) to Anterior Height (N-Me) is 56% to 44%. Therefore, a tendency to open bite will occur and a downward, backward growth of mandible will be observed.

Ricketts analysis

The Rickett analysis also consists of following measurements

Sassouni analysis 
This analysis, developed by Viken Sassouni in 1955, states that in a well proportioned face, the following four planes meet at the point O. The point O is located in the posterior cranial base. This method categorized the vertical and the horizontal relationship and the interaction between the vertical proportions of the face. The planes he created are: 
 Supraorbital plane (anterior clinoid to roof of orbits)
 Palatal plane (ANS-PNS)
 Occlusal plane (Downs occlusal plane)
 Mandibular plane (Go-Me)
The more parallel the planes, the greater the tendency for deep bite and the more non-parallel they are the greater the tendency for open bite. Using the O as the centre, Sassouni created the following arcs
 Anterior Arc – Arc of a circle between the anterior cranial base and the mandibular plane, with O as the center and O-ANS as the radius.
 Posterior Arc – Arc of a circle between anterior cranial base and mandibular base with O as centre and OSp as radius. 
 Basal Arc – From A point should pass through B point 
 Midfacial Arc – From Te and should pass tangent to the mesial surface of the maxillary first molar

Harvold analysis 
This analysis was developed by Egil Peter Harvold in 1974. This analysis developed standards for the unit length of the maxilla and mandible. The difference between the unit length describes the disharmony between the jaws. It is important to know that location of teeth is not taken into account in this analysis.

The maxillary unit length is measured from posterior border of mandibular condyle (Co) to ANS. The mandibular unit length is measured from posterior border of mandibular condyle (Co) to Pogonion. This analysis also looks at the lower facial height which is from upper ANS to Menton.

McNamara analysis

COGS analysis (cephalometrics for orthognathic surgery) 
This analysis was developed by Charles J. Burstone when it was presented in 1978 in an issue of AJODO. This was followed by Soft Tissue Cephalometric Analysis for Orthognathic Surgery in 1980 by Arnette et al. In this analysis, Burstone et al. used a plane called horizontal plane, which was a constructed of Frankfurt Horizontal Plane.  

 Counterpart Analysis
 Template Analysis

Computerised cephalometrics 
Computerised cephalometrics is the process of entering cephalometric data in digital format into a computer for cephalometric analysis. Digitization (of radiographs) is the conversion of landmarks on a radiograph or tracing to numerical values on a two- (or three-) dimensional coordinate system, usually for the purpose of computerized cephalometric analysis. The process allows for automatic measurement of landmark relationships. Depending on the software and hardware available, the incorporation of data can be performed by digitizing points on a tracing, by scanning a tracing or a conventional radiograph, or by originally obtaining computerized radiographic images that are already in digital format, instead of conventional radiographs. Computerized cephalometrics offers the advantages of instant analysis; readily available race-, sex- and age-related norms for comparison; as well as ease of soft tissue change and surgical predictions. Computerized cephalometrics has also helped in eliminating any surgeon inadequacies as well as making the process less time-consuming.

The first medically certified automated cephalometric analysis of 2D lateral cephalometric radiographs by Artificial intelligence was brought to market in November 2019.

Digitization 
Computer processing of cephalometric radiographs uses a digitizer. Digitization refers to the process of expressing analog information in a digital form. A digitizer is a computer input device which converts analog information into an electronic equivalent in the computer's memory.  In this treatise and its application to computerized cephalometrics, digitization refers to the resolving of headfilm landmarks into two numeric or digital entities – the X and Y coordinate. 3D analysis would have third quantity – Z coordinate.

Superimposition 
Cephalometric radiographs can be superimposed on each other to see the amount of growth that has taken place in an individual or to visualize the amount of movement of teeth that has happened in the orthodontic treatment. It is important to superimpose the radiograph on a stable anatomical structures. Traditionally, this process has been done by tracing and superimposing on cranial landmarks. One of the most common used methods of superimposing is called the Structural Method.

Structural method 
According to American Board of Orthodontics, this method is based on series of study performed by Arne Bjork, Birte Melsen and Donald Enlow. This method divides superimposition in three categories: Cranial base superimposition, maxillary superimposition and mandibular superimposition. Some of the important landmarks in each category is listed below as per the structural method.

Cranial base superimposition 

 The inner contour of the anterior wall of sella turcica 
 Walker point  
 The anterior contour of the middle cranial fossa  
 The contour of the cribriform plate  
 Details in the trabecular system in the anterior cranial fossa.  
 The contours of the bilateral fronto-ethmoidal crests.  
 The cerebral surfaces of the orbital roofs

Mandibular superimposition 

 The anterior contour of the chin
 The inner cortical structure at the inferior border of the mandibular symphysis.
 Trabecular structures in the mandibular symphysis.
 Trabecular structures related to the mandibular canal.
 The lower contour of a molar germ

Maxillary superimposition 

 The anterior contour of the zygomatic process

See also 
 Orthodontic technology

References

Orthodontics